Mathieu Scalet (born 1 April 1997) is a French professional footballer who plays as a midfielder for Podbeskidzie Bielsko-Biała.

Career
Scalet started his career with the youth teams of French side Saint-Genis-Ferney-Crozet before moving to Poland to join Wisła Kraków and then Beskid Andrychów. He made several appearances for the Wisła Kraków second team during his spell at the club.
On 26 November 2017, Scalet made his senior debut for Śląsk Wrocław as a 90th minute substitute during their 1–0 win over Zagłębie Lubin, coming on to provide the assist for Piotr Celeban to score the winner. He has also played several games for the Śląsk Wrocław second team in the fourth and fifth tiers of Polish football.

References

External links

Living people
1997 births
People from Annemasse
Sportspeople from Haute-Savoie
French footballers
Association football forwards
Śląsk Wrocław players
Podbeskidzie Bielsko-Biała players
Ekstraklasa players
I liga players
III liga players
French expatriate sportspeople in Poland
Expatriate footballers in Poland
French expatriate footballers
Footballers from Auvergne-Rhône-Alpes